The GWR 0-6-0PT (Pannier Tank), is a type of steam locomotive built by the British Great Western Railway with the water tanks carried on both sides of the boiler, in the manner of panniers. They were used for local, suburban and branch line passenger and goods traffic, for shunting duties, and as banker engines on inclines.  The early examples, such as the 1901 and 2021 classes, were rebuilt from saddle or side tanks when the locos received a Belpaire firebox – this type of firebox has a square top and is incompatible with a curved saddle tank. This process mostly took place during the tenure at Swindon Works of George Jackson Churchward. Only a very small number of saddle tank locomotives escaped rebuilding as panniers, notably the 1361 Class built new under Churchward in 1910, by which date a few of the 1813 Class had already been rebuilt as pannier tanks.

Classification

 

The GWR pannier tank locomotives were classified as follows: 

Small engines (wheelbase under 15'), rebuilt from saddle or side tanks
 93, 850, 1901 ClassesG. Armstrong/W'hampton 1874-95, 292 locos
 2021, 2101 ClassesDean/W'hampton 1897-1905, 140 locos
Small engines (wheelbase under 15'), built as pannier tanks from new
 5400 ClassCollett/Swindon 1930, 25 locos
 6400, 7400 ClassesCollett/Swindon 1932-50, 90 locos
 1366 ClassCollett/Swindon 1934, six locos
 1600 ClassHawksworth/Swindon 1949-55, 80 locos
Large engines (wheelbase over 15'), rebuilt from saddle or side tanks
 302 ClassJ. Armstrong/W'hampton 1864-5, eight locos
 1016 ClassG. Armstrong/W'hampton 1867-71, eight locos
 1076 (Buffalo), 1134 ClassesJ. Armstrong/Swindon 1870-1881, 266 locos
 645, 1501 ClassesG. Armstrong/W'hampton 1872-81, 106 locos
 119 ClassG. Armstrong/W'hampton (renewals after Gooch) 1878-83, 11 locos
 322 ClassG. Armstrong/W'hampton (renewals after Beyer) 1878-85, six locos
 1813 ClassDean/Swindon 1882-4, 40 locos
 1661 ClassDean/Swindon 1886-7, 40 locos
 655 ClassG. Armstrong/W'hampton 1892-7, 52 locos
 1854 ClassDean/Swindon 1890-95, 120 locos
 2721 ClassDean/Swindon 1897-1901, 80 locos
Large engines (wheelbase over 15'), built as pannier tanks from new
 GWR 5700 ClassCollett/Swindon and outside firms 1929-50, 863 locos (includes sub-class 8750)
 GWR 9400 ClassHawksworth/Swindon and outside firms 1947-56, 210 locos
Large boiler/short wheelbase
 GWR 1500 ClassHawksworth/Swindon 1949, 10 locos

Preservation

In fiction 
 In The Railway Series of children's books by the Wilbert Awdry and the television series Thomas & Friends the character Duck the Great Western Engine is based on a 5700 Class pannier tank.
 No. 5775 is in the 1970 film The Railway Children, in a brown livery, with the initials of the fictitious Great Northern and Southern Railway on the tank sides.
 No. 6412 was in the 1970s children's TV series The Flockton Flyer.
 No. 5764 was in the 1976 short film "The Signalman", loosely based on the Charles Dickens book of the same name.

References

Sources
 Site with much detail information on boilers etc.

 
0-6-0PT